Driver Babu is a 1986 Indian Telugu language action drama film directed by Boina Subba Rao starring Sobhan Babu and Radha. A remake  of the Hindi film Khud-daar, it emerged as a critical and commercial success.

Cast
 Sobhan Babu as Raja aka Driver Babu
 Radha as Gowri
Kaikala Satyanarayana as Madhava Rao
 Tulasi as Radha
 Rajya Lakshmi as Chandini
 Pramila
 Ponni
 Gummadi as Narayana Rao
 Rajesh as Ravi
 Prabhakar Reddy as Keshava Rao
 P. L. Narayana as Raheem Chacha
 Veerabhadra Rao as Dakshinamurthy
 Raja Varma
 Gokina Rama Rao as Public Prosecutor
 Bheema Raju
 Senthil
 K. K. Sharma

Soundtrack 
Soundtrack was composed by K. Chakravarthy.
"Nunnaga" - S. P. Balasubrahmanyam, P. Susheela
"Mundepu" - S. P. Balasubrahmanyam, P. Susheela
"Oosoci" - S. P. Balasubrahmanyam
"Yelomaanu" - P Susheela
"Mudduku" - S. P. Balasubrahmanyam, P. Susheela

References

1986 films
1980s Telugu-language films
Films scored by K. Chakravarthy
Telugu remakes of Hindi films